Women's 800m races for wheelchair athletes at the 2004 Summer Paralympics were held in the Athens Olympic Stadium. Events were held in two disability classes.

T53

The T53 event consisted of 2 heats and a final. It was won by Cheri Blauwet, representing .

1st Round

Heat 1
19 Sept. 2004, 19:10

Heat 2
19 Sept. 2004, 19:18

Final Round
20 Sept. 2004, 20:00

T54

The T54 event consisted of 2 heats and a final. It was won by Chantal Petitclerc, representing .

1st Round

Heat 1
21 Sept. 2004, 09:20

Heat 2
21 Sept. 2004, 09:27

Final Round
22 Sept. 2004, 19:35

References

W
2004 in women's athletics